is a Japanese actor, singer, and voice actor. He is best known for playing Shishio Makoto in the anime Rurouni Kenshin.

Filmography

Television animation
1980s
 Kimagure Orange Road (1987) – "Night of Summer Side" (opening theme)
1990s
 Battle Spirits Ryuuko no Ken (1993) – Robert Garcia
 Mehyō Sakunetsu no Sniper (1996)
 Rurouni Kenshin (1996) – Shishio Makoto
2000s
 Atto Homu (2000) – Takashi Ōkubo
 Yu-Gi-Oh! Duel Monsters (2000) – Narrator
 The Prince of Tennis (2001) – Yūdai Yamato
 Nanba Kinyū-den Minami no Teiō V-Cinema 34: "Brand no Jūatsu" (2006)
 Reborn! (2006) – Xanxus
2010s
 Kaseifu no Mita (2011) – Isao Minakawa
 Black Angels 2 (2012)
 Black Angels 3 (2012)

Theatrical animation
 Yu-Gi-Oh! Duel Monsters: Pyramid of Light (2004) – Narrator
 Rurouni Kenshin – Shin Kyoto-Hen: Zenpen Homura no Ori (2011) – Shishio Makoto
 Rurouni Kenshin – Shin Kyoto-hen: Hikari no Saezuri (2012) – Shishio Makoto

Video games
 Katekyō Hitman Reborn! DS Flame Rumble Kaien Ring Soudatsusen! (2007) - Xanxus
 Katekyō Hitman Reborn! DS Flame Rumble Hyper - Moeyo Mirai (2008) - Xanxus
 Katekyō Hitman Reborn! DS Fate of Heat Honō no Sadame (2008) - Xanxus
 Katekyō Hitman Reborn! Battle Arena (2008) - Xanxus
 Katekyō Hitman Reborn! Dream Hyper Battle! (2008) - Xanxus
 Katekyō Hitman Reborn! Kindan no Yami no Delta (2008) - Xanxus
 katekyo hitman REBORN! DS Flame Rumble X - Mirai Chou-Bakuhatsu!! (2009) - Xanxus
 Katekyō Hitman Reborn! Fate of Heat II - Unmei no Futari (2009) - Xanxus
 Katekyō Hitman Reborn! Battle Arena 2 - Spirits Burst (2009) - Xanxus
 Katekyō Hitman Reborn! DS Ore ga Boss! Saikyō Family Taisen (2009) - Xanxus
 Katekyō Hitman Reborn! DS Flame Rumble XX - Kessen! Real 6 Chouka (2010) - Xanxus
 Katekyo Hitman Reborn! Kizuna no Tagbattle (2010) - Xanxus
 J-Stars Victory VS (2014) – Shishio Makoto
 Jump Force (2019) – Shishio Makoto

Tokusatsu
 Kamen Rider Wizard (2012) – Oikawa

References

External links
Official site

1966 births
Japanese male voice actors
Japanese male singers
Living people
Male actors from Kyoto Prefecture
Musicians from Kyoto Prefecture